The 1978–79 Tennessee Volunteers basketball team represented the University of Tennessee as a member of the Southeastern Conference during the 1978–79 college basketball season. Led by first-year head coach Don DeVoe, the team played their home games at the Stokely Athletic Center in Knoxville, Tennessee. The Volunteers finished with a record of 21–12 (12–6 SEC, 2nd) and, after winning the SEC tournament, received an automatic bid to the 1979 NCAA tournament as the 8 seed in the Mideast region.

This was the first of five straight seasons of NCAA Tournament basketball for the Tennessee men's program.

Roster

Schedule and results

|-
!colspan=9 style=| Regular season

|-
!colspan=9 style=| SEC tournament

|-
!colspan=9 style=| NCAA tournament

Rankings

NBA Draft

References

Tennessee Volunteers basketball seasons
Tennessee
Tennessee
Volunteers
Volunteers